"I'm Goin' Down" is a 1984 song by Bruce Springsteen.

I'm Going Down may also refer to:

 "I'm Going Down", a song by the Rolling Stones from the 1975 album Metamorphosis
 "I'm Going Down" (Rose Royce song), 1976, also covered by Mary J. Blige

See also
 Going Down (disambiguation)